Pleasure Death is the second (mini-)album by the rock band Therapy? It was released on 27 January 1992 on Wiiija Records. The album was recorded on 14 and 15 August 1991 and mixed on 16 and 17 August 1991 at Southern Studios in London. It reached number 1 in the UK Indie Charts.

The album was originally released by Wiiija on 12" vinyl. In 1993, Southern Records re-issued the album on 12" vinyl, CD and cassette.

The album was remastered in 2010 by Harvey Birrell and has been touted for possible release since then, although nothing has been confirmed as yet.

Track listing 
All songs written by Therapy?

Personnel 
Therapy?
 Andy Cairns – vocals, guitar
 Fyfe Ewing – vocals, drums
 Michael McKeegan – bass
Technical
 Harvey Birrell and Therapy? - producer
 Harvey Birrell and John Loder – engineers

Trivia 
 The sample in "Skinning Pit" ("Every once in a while I'd have to take a beating. But by then, I didn't care. The way I saw it, everybody takes a beating sometime") is taken from the 1990 movie Goodfellas and is spoken by actor Ray Liotta.
 The sample in "Potato Junkie" ("Don't you ever feel attracted to the girls you photograph…") is often cited as having come from the 1978 movie Pretty Baby, being spoken by actress Brooke Shields and actor Keith Carradine, but is in fact from the 1981 ozploitation film Centrespread, being spoken by actress Kylie Foster and actor Paul Trahair.

References 

1992 albums
Wiiija albums
Therapy? albums